Phyllonorycter chalcobaphes is a moth of the family Gracillariidae. It is known from Mexico.

References

chalcobaphes
Moths of Central America
Moths described in 1914